Richard Poirier (born Gloucester, Massachusetts, September 9, 1925, died New York City, August 15, 2009) was an American literary critic.

Career 
He graduated from Amherst College, Yale University, and Harvard University, and also studied under the literary critic F. R. Leavis at Downing College, Cambridge on a Fulbright Scholarship.

He co-founded the Library of America, and served as chairman of its board. He was the Marius Bewley Professor of American and English Literature at Rutgers University. He was also the editor of Raritan, a literary quarterly, and an editor of Partisan Review. He was series editor of Prize Stories: The O. Henry Awards from 1961 to 1966.

In 1968, he signed the "Writers and Editors War Tax Protest" pledge, vowing to refuse tax payments in protest against the Vietnam War.

Works
 Stories British and American (1953) with Jack Barry Ludwig
 The Comic Sense of Henry James: A Study of the Early Novels (1960)
 In Defense of Reading : A Reader's Approach to Literary Criticism (1963) editor with Reuben A. Brower
 A World Elsewhere: The Place of Style in American Literature (1966)
 American Literature: Volume Two (Little, Brown 1970) editor with William L. Vance
 The Oxford Reader: Varieties of Contemporary Discourse (1971) editor with Frank Kermode
 The Performing Self: Compositions and Decompositions in the Languages of Contemporary Life (1971)
 Mailer (Fontana Modern Masters, 1972)
 Robert Frost: The Work of Knowing (1977)
 The Renewal Of Literature: Emersonian Reflections (Random House, 1987) 
 Raritan Reading (1990) editor
 Ralph Waldo Emerson (1990)
 Poetry and Pragmatism (1992)
 Collected Poems, Prose, and Plays of Robert Frost (Library of America, 1995) editor with Mark Richardson
 Trying It Out in America: Literary and Other Performances (2003)

References

External links
 Finding aid to Richard Poirier Collection at Columbia University. Rare Book & Manuscript Library.
 New York Times obituary
 Biographical page
 Special issue of College Hill Review (No. 5, Winter/Spring 2010) devoted to Richard Poirier and his legacy. Contributors include former colleagues, friends, and students. Among the articles is an extensive annotated bibliography of Poirier's writings.

1925 births
2009 deaths
People from Gloucester, Massachusetts
Rutgers University faculty
American gay writers
American tax resisters
Amherst College alumni
Yale University alumni
Harvard University alumni
Alumni of Downing College, Cambridge
20th-century LGBT people